The following is a list of speakers of the Montana House of Representatives since statehood.

References

Government of Montana
Speakers
Montana